Charles Kofi Adu Boahen is a Ghanaian politician and public servant. He is a member of the New Patriotic Party and the deputy minister for Finance in Ghana. He is the son of Albert Adu Boahen, the New Patriotic Party flagbearer in the 1992 Ghanaian general elections. He was the Minister of State at the Finance Ministry but was dismissed after allegations of corruption.

Education 
He had his BSc in Chemical Engineering from the University of Southern California. He also had his MBA from the Harvard Business School. He attended Achimota School where he had his O Level and Mfantsipim School where he had his 'A' Level.

Career 
He was the Director and Regional Head of Corporate and Investment Banking for SBSA. He was the CEO of Black Star Advisors, Primrose Properties Ghana, an investment bank and asset management firm, a boutique and a real estate development company.

He was the Vice President for JP Morgan for over five years and Head of Investment Banking for Sub-Saharan Africa.

Corruption Scandal 
In November 2022, the President of the Republic of Ghana sacked him from his position as Minister of State on account of corruption related to the illegal mining activities popularly known as "Galamsey" (filmed by investigative journalist Anas Aremeyaw Anas) in Ghana. In a purported video, Charles referenced the vice president of Ghana, Dr Bawumia as an accomplice in siphoning investor funds and bribe for personal gains in what was termed as an "appearance fee".

References

Living people
New Patriotic Party politicians
Government ministers of Ghana
Year of birth missing (living people)
University of Southern California alumni
Harvard Business School alumni
Ghanaian Presbyterians
Ghanaian Protestants